Kim is a novel by Nobel Prize-winning English author Rudyard Kipling. It was first published serially in McClure's Magazine from December 1900 to October 1901 as well as in Cassell's Magazine from January to November 1901, and first published in book form by Macmillan & Co. Ltd in October 1901. The story unfolds against the backdrop of the Great Game, the political conflict between Russia and Britain in Central Asia. The novel popularized the phrase and idea of the Great Game.

Setting
It is set after the Second Afghan War (which ended in 1881), but before the Third (fought in 1919), probably in the period 1893 to 1898. The novel is notable for its detailed portrait of the people, culture, and varied religions of India. "The book presents a vivid picture of India, its teeming populations, religions, and superstitions, and the life of the bazaars and the road."

Accolades
In 1998, the Modern Library ranked Kim No. 78 on its list of the 100 best English-language novels of the 20th century. In 2003 the book was listed on the BBC's The Big Read poll of the UK's "best-loved novel".

Plot summary
Kim (Kimball O'Hara) is the orphaned son of an Irish soldier (Kimball O'Hara Sr., a former colour sergeant and later an employee of an Indian railway company) and a poor Irish mother (a former nanny in a colonel's household) who have both died in poverty. Living a vagabond existence in India under British rule in the late 19th century, Kim earns his living by begging and running small errands on the streets of Lahore. He occasionally works for Mahbub Ali, a Pashtun horse trader who is one of the native operatives of the British secret service. Kim is so immersed in the local culture that few realise he is a white child, although he carries a packet of documents from his father entrusted to him by an Indian woman who cared for him.

Kim befriends an aged Tibetan lama who is on a quest to free himself from the Wheel of Things by finding the legendary ″River of the Arrow″. Kim becomes his chela, or disciple, and accompanies him on his journey. On the way, Kim incidentally learns about parts of the Great Game and is recruited by Mahbub Ali to carry a message to the head of British intelligence in Umballa. Kim's trip with the lama along the Grand Trunk Road is the first great adventure in the novel.

By chance, Kim's father's regimental chaplain identifies Kim by his Masonic certificate, which he wears around his neck, and Kim is forcibly separated from the lama. The lama insists that Kim should comply with the chaplain's plan because he believes it is in Kim's best interests, and the boy is sent to an English school in Lucknow. The lama, a former abbot, funds Kim's education. Kim is divided between his love for his Lama master, and his eagerness to become a secret agent and even have a price put on his head, and his natural independence as a free spirit.

Throughout his years at school, Kim remains in contact with the holy man he has come to love. Kim also retains contact with his secret service connections and is trained in espionage (to be a surveyor) while on vacation from school by Lurgan Sahib, a sort of benevolent Fagin, at his jewellery shop in Simla. As part of his training, Kim looks at a tray full of mixed objects and notes which have been added or taken away, a pastime still called Kim's Game, also called the Jewel Game. Other parts of this training are disguise and the careful study of Indian population, and the characteristic dress, behaviour and "even how they spit" in order to go undercover or to discover those in disguise.

After three years of schooling, Kim is given a government appointment so that he can begin to participate in the Great Game. Before this appointment begins, however, he is granted a much-deserved break. Kim rejoins the lama and at the behest of Kim's superior, Hurree Chunder Mookherjee, they make a trip to the Himalayas so Kim can investigate what some Russian intelligence agents are doing.

Kim obtains maps, papers and other important items from the Russians, who are working to undermine British control of the region. Mookherjee befriends the Russians undercover, acting as a guide, and ensures that they do not recover the lost items. Kim, aided by some porters and villagers, helps to rescue the lama.

The lama realises that he has gone astray. His search for the River of the Arrow should be taking place in the plains, not in the mountains, and he orders the porters to take them back. Here Kim and the lama are nursed back to health after their arduous journey. Kim delivers the Russian documents to Hurree, and a concerned Mahbub Ali comes to check on Kim.

The lama finds his river and is convinced he has achieved Enlightenment, and wants to share it with Kim. However, it is not revealed what happens to them next.

Characters
Kimball "Kim" O'Hara – an orphan son of an Irish soldier, the protagonist; "A poor white, the poorest of the poor"
Teshoo Lama – a Tibetan lama, the former abbot of the Such-zen monastery in the western Himalayas, on a spiritual journey
Mahbub Ali – a famous Ghilzai Pashtun horse trader and spy for the British.
Colonel Creighton – British Army officer, ethnologist, and spy
Lurgan Sahib – a Simla gem trader and spy
Hurree Chunder Mookherjee (Hurree Babu, also the Babu) – a Bengali intelligence operative working for the British; Kim's direct superior
the Kulu woman (the Sahiba)- an old hill Rajput noble lady settled near Saharanpur in the plains.
the Woman of Shamlegh (Lispeth) who helps Kim and the Lama to evade the Russian spies and return to the plains
the old soldier – a Sikh Risaldar (native officer) who had been loyal to the British during the Mutiny.
Reverend Arthur Bennett – the Church of England chaplain of the Mavericks, the Irish regiment to which Kim's father belonged
Father Victor – the Roman Catholic chaplain of the Mavericks
a Lucknow prostitute whom Kim pays to help disguise him
a Kamboh farmer whose sick child Kim helps to cure
Huneefa – a sorceress who performs a devil invocation ritual to protect Kim
E.23 – a spy for the British whom Kim helps avoid capture
Her Majesty's Royal Loyal Musketeers, also known as the Mavericks – a fictional Irish Regiment of the British Army which also mentioned in Kipling's novella "The Mutiny of the Mavericks"

Locations mentioned in the novel

 Kipling's father John Lockwood Kipling was the curator of the old, original Lahore Museum, and is described in the scene where Kim meets the lama. The present Lahore Museum building was completed later.
 The gun in front of the Lahore Museum described in the first chapter is an existing piece called Zamzama, sometimes referred to as Kim's gun.
 The "Gate of the Harpies", where Mahbub Ali is made unconscious and searched by the treacherous prostitute "Flower of Delight" and her "smooth-faced Kashmiri" pimp, still exists in the old city of Lahore, Pakistan. It is known as the "Heera Mandi" and is in the Taxali Gate area. Prostitution is still a common trade there.
 Kim dreams of a "Red bull in a green field" which he recognises when he sees a military formation ensign of a bull on a green background. The formation ensign is still used by a military formation in Ambala Cantonment in India. Even in the book the formation ensign belonged to an establishment in Ambala.  A yellow bull in a red field is the sleeve patch for the Delhi and Rajasthan Area formation of the Indian Army. The Grenadier Guards of the British Army also have a Tactical Recognition Flash depicting a black bull with red hooves on a green background.
 The Jang-i-Lat sahib (Urdu: War Lord/Commander-in-Chief) who comes to dinner to Col. Creighton's house, is in fact based on the real British Indian Army general, Field Marshal Lord Roberts of Kandahar, who was known to both John Lockwood and Rudyard Kipling.
 St Xavier's School, Lucknow, where Kim is sent to study, is in fact based on the La Martiniere Lucknow college.
 The small Simla shop of Lurgan sahib, with all its antiques, curios, etc., was based on a real shop, once run in Simla's bazaar by AM Jacob, a person who might have been the model for Lurgan himself.
 The quote "We'll make a man of you at Sanawar—even at the price o' making you a Protestant" refers to the Lawrence School, Sanawar.

Critical assessment
Considered by many to be Kipling's masterpiece, opinion appears varied about its consideration as children's literature or not. Roger Sale, in his history of children's literature, concludes "Kim is the apotheosis of the Victorian cult of childhood, but it shines now as bright as ever, long after the Empire's collapse..."

About a reissue of the novel in 1959 by Macmillan, the reviewer opines "Kim is a book worked at three levels. It is a tale of adventure...It is the drama of a boy having entirely his boy's own way... and it is the mystical exegesis of this pattern of behaviour..." This reviewer concludes "Kim will endure because it is a beginning like all masterly ends..."

Nirad C. Chaudhuri considered it the best story (in English) about India itself – singling out Kipling’s appreciation of the ecological force of “the twin setting of the mountains and the plain...an unbreakable articulation between the Himalayas and the Indo-Gangetic plain”.

Adaptations

Film and television

 An MGM film adaptation of the novel, directed by Victor Saville and produced by Leon Gordon, was released in 1950. It was adapted by Helen Deutsch and Leon Gordon, and starred Errol Flynn, Dean Stockwell, Paul Lukas, Robert Douglas, Thomas Gomez and Cecil Kellaway. It featured a music score by André Previn.
In 1960, a one-hour color adaptation of Kim was televised as part of NBC's series Shirley Temple's Storybook. Tony Haig portrayed Kim, Michael Rennie played Captain Creighton, and Alan Napier played Colonel Devlin. The episode has been released on DVD.
 A London Films television film version of Kim was made in 1984. It was directed by John Davies and starred Peter O'Toole, Bryan Brown, John Rhys-Davies, Julian Glover and Ravi Sheth as Kim. In 2006 it was released on DVD by Home Video Entertainment.

Games
 A 2016 computer game, named after the novel, adapted the book.

Homages to and works inspired by Kim
 The first part of Robert Heinlein's 1957 novel Citizen of the Galaxy depicts a clever  boy of mysterious parentage living in a feudal planet and guided by an interstellar spy. Peopled with fakirs, street vendors and wealthy elites, the beginning of the novel parallels Kim in many ways.
Paul Scott's four-novel sequence The Raj Quartet (1966-1975) contains a subplot which mirrors Kim: an Indian boy (Hari Kumar/Harry Coomer) is sent to England by his wealthy father to be raised in such a manner that when he returns, Englishmen will not be able to tell that he's Indian.
 Poul Anderson's 1985 Game of Empire, the last of his Dominic Flandry series, is loosely modeled on Kim. Like others in the series, the novel takes place in a future galactic empire setting.
 T.N. Murari's The Imperial Agent (1989) is a sequel.
 Tim Powers's 2001 novel Declare uses Kim for inspiration and epigraphs.
 In Laurie R. King's 2004 novel The Game (book 7 of the Mary Russell series), the protagonist and her husband, Sherlock Holmes, travel to India in search of Kimball O'Hara, who Holmes has encountered after the events of "The Final Problem".
 Steven Gould's 2011 novel 7th Sigma is based on the novel. Gould's work features a young boy (named Kim) who is raised by a martial arts teacher and becomes involved in intelligence work. He becomes a trained agent. Quotes from Kim are used as chapter headers.

Real life tributes
The town of Kim, Colorado is named in honour of the book.

British spy and defector Kim Philby was born Harold Philby in Ambala, then in British India.  His father, a member of the Indian Civil Service, gave him the nickname 'Kim' on account of his fraternisation with the servants.

References

Bibliography

Editions
The Sussex edition is standard for Kipling's works. Noted critical editions include:
 Kipling, Rudyard. Kim (Harmondsworth: Penguin, 1987).  With an introduction and notes by Edward Said. 
 Kipling, Rudyard, Kim, (New York: W. W. Norton & Company, 2002).  A modern edition with extensive notes, essays, maps and references.

Critical works
 Benedetti, Amedeo, Il Kim di Kipling. In: "LG Argomenti", Genova, Erga, a. XLIII (2007), n. 4, pp. 17–21.
 Hopkirk, Peter, Quest for Kim: in Search of Kipling's Great Game (London: John Murray, 1996).   The author visits the locations of the novel and discusses the real-life personages that may have possibly inspired its characters.
 Wilson, Angus, The Strange Ride of Rudyard Kipling: His Life and Works, (New York, The Viking Press: 1977).

External links

Sources
 
Kim available at Internet Archive (scanned books, illustrated)
  (plain text and HTML)
 
Criticism
"Kim, by Rudyard Kipling", by Ian Mackean. Literary analysis.
Kerr, Douglas. Kim. The Literary Encyclopedia. 21 March 2002. Accessed 19 May 2008.
"Artist of empire: Kipling and Kim", The Hudson Review, Winter 2003 by Clara Clairborne Park.
Kim: Study Guide", from eNotes
Kim, reviewed in The Atlantic, 1901.
Kim; Rudyard Kipling's Fascinating Story of India, reviewed in The New York Times, 1901.
Other
Kim travels

1901 British novels
Novels by Rudyard Kipling
British spy novels
Novels about the Great Game
Novels first published in serial form
20th-century British children's literature
British novels adapted into films
Picaresque novels
Works originally published in McClure's
Victorian novels
Novels set in India
Novels set in the 19th century
Macmillan Publishers books
Novels about orphans
Lahore in fiction
Buddhist novels
Novels set in Tibet
Novels set in British India